Peryf ap Cedifor (fl. c. 1170) was a Welsh-language court poet.

Peryf is noted for two elegies he composed in honour of his brothers.  These included his natural brothers and also his bardic patron and foster brother Hywel ab Owain Gwynedd.

References
Kathleen Anne Bramley and Morfydd Owen (ed.), Gwaith Llywelyn Fardd I ac eraill o feirdd y ddeuddegfed ganrif (Cardiff, 1994).

Welsh-language poets
12th-century Welsh poets
Year of birth unknown
Year of death unknown